Buzhan (also Romanized as Būzhān; also known as Būzān and Mūzer) is a village in Fazl Rural District, in the Central District of Nishapur County, Razavi Khorasan Province, Iran. At the 2006 census, its population was 756, in 246 families.

Incidents 
On July 24, 1987, a flood in Buzhan village killed over 1,000 people and destroyed some villages.

References 

Populated places in Nishapur County